Jan Vetešník (born 5 March 1984) is a Czech rower. He competed in the Men's lightweight coxless four event at the 2012 Summer Olympics with his twin Ondřej.

References

1984 births
Living people
Czech male rowers
Olympic rowers of the Czech Republic
Rowers at the 2012 Summer Olympics
Rowers at the 2016 Summer Olympics
Rowers from Prague
Czech twins
European Rowing Championships medalists